Cosmotoma is a genus of beetles in the family Cerambycidae, containing the following species:

 Cosmotoma adjuncta (Thomson, 1860)
 Cosmotoma fasciata Fisher, 1931
 Cosmotoma melzeri Gilmour, 1955
 Cosmotoma nigra Gilmour, 1955
 Cosmotoma olivacea Gilmour, 1955
 Cosmotoma pallida Gilmour, 1955
 Cosmotoma sertifer (Audinet-Serville, 1835)
 Cosmotoma suturalis Gilmour, 1955
 Cosmotoma triangularis Gilmour, 1955
 Cosmotoma viridana Lacordaire, 1872
 Cosmotoma zikani Melzer, 1927

References

 
Acanthocinini